Torkel Persson (June 21, 1894, Undersåker, Jämtland – August 6, 1972) was a Swedish cross-country skier from Offerdal in Jämtland who competed in the 1924 Winter Olympics.

In 1924 he finished fifth in the 50 kilometre event as well as ninth in the 18 km competition.

Cross-country skiing results

Olympic Games

External links
 Cross-country skiing 1924 
Torkel Persson in a ski competition in Östersund, Sweden
The home of Torkel Persson in Oldåbacken, Frankrike, Offerdal

1894 births
1972 deaths
People from Åre Municipality
Cross-country skiers from Jämtland County
Swedish male cross-country skiers
Olympic cross-country skiers of Sweden
Cross-country skiers at the 1924 Winter Olympics